Aleksandr Dmitriyevich Chumakov (5 May 1948 – 8 July 2012) was a Soviet football player.

Career
Born in Moscow, Chumakov made 125 Soviet Top League appearances for FC Torpedo Moscow from 1966 to 1972. He finished his playing career with FC Spartak Semipalatinsk in 1975.

Chumakov made three appearances for the USSR during 1968 and 1969, his debut having been on 16 June 1968 in a friendly against Austria.

Honours
 Soviet Cup winner: 1968, 1972.

References

External links
  Profile

1948 births
2012 deaths
Soviet footballers
Soviet Union international footballers
FC Torpedo Moscow players
Soviet Top League players
Russian footballers
Association football defenders
Association football midfielders